Kevin Esteve Rigail (born 27 December 1989) is an alpine skier and professional golfer from Andorra. He competed for Andorra at the 2010 Winter Olympics.

Golf career
Esteve turned professional in 2015 after breaking his knee in 2014. He has primarily played on the Alps Tour, MENA Tour and Nordic Golf League.

References

External links 
 
 
 
 
 

1989 births
Living people
Andorran male alpine skiers
Andorran male golfers
Olympic alpine skiers of Andorra
Alpine skiers at the 2010 Winter Olympics
Alpine skiers at the 2014 Winter Olympics
Mediterranean Games competitors for Andorra
Competitors at the 2018 Mediterranean Games